Balanites aegyptiaca (also known as the Egyptian balsam) is a species of tree, classified as a member of either the Zygophyllaceae or the Balanitaceae. This tree is native to much of Africa and parts of the Middle East.

There are many common names for this plant. In English the fruit has been called desert date, soap berry tree or bush, Thron tree, Egyptian myrobalan, Egyptian balsam or Zachum oil tree;  in Arabic it is known as lalob, hidjihi, inteishit, and heglig (hijlij). In Jieng it is called Thou or thau, in Hausa it is called aduwa, in Tamasheq, the Tuareg language taboraq, in Fulfulde (Pulaar) Murtooki or Tanni, in Swahili mchunju, in Kamba Kilului and in Amharic bedena.

Distribution
Balanites aegyptiaca is found in Northern Eastern Africa, Egypt, and also the Sahel-Savannah region across Africa and the Arabian Peninsula. It can be found in many kinds of habitat, tolerating a wide variety of soil types, from sand to heavy clay, and climatic moisture levels, from arid to subhumid. It is relatively tolerant of flooding, livestock activity, and wildfire.

Description
The Balanites aegyptiaca tree reaches  in height with a generally narrow form. The branches have long, straight green spines arranged in spirals. The dark green compound leaves grow out of the base of the spines
and are made up of two leaflets which are variable in size and shape. The fluted trunk has grayish-brown, ragged bark with yellow-green patches where it is shed.

The inflorescence consists of bunches of a few flowers which are either sessile or are borne on short stalks. The flower buds are ovoid and covered in a short tomentose pubescence.

The carpenter ant Camponotus sericeus feeds on the nectar exuded by the flowers. The larva of the cabbage tree emperor moth Bunaea alcinoe causes defoliation of the tree.

Cultivation

Food

Balanites aegyptiaca has been cultivated in Egypt for more than 4000 years, and stones placed in tombs as votive offerings have been found as far back as the Twelfth Dynasty. The tree was described in 1592 by Prospero Alpini under the name 'agihalid'. Linnaeus regarded it as a species of Ximenia, but Michel Adanson proposed the new genus of Agialid. The genus Balanites was founded in 1813 by Delile.

The yellow, single-seeded fruit is edible, but bitter. Many parts of the plant are used as famine foods in Africa; the leaves are eaten raw or cooked, the oily seed is boiled to make it less bitter and eaten mixed with sorghum, and the flowers can be eaten.  The tree is considered valuable in arid regions because it produces fruit even in dry times. The fruit can be fermented for alcoholic beverages.

The seed cake remaining after the oil is extracted is commonly used as animal fodder in Africa. The seeds of the Balanites aegyptiaca have molluscicide effect on Biomphalaria pfeifferi.

Where the species coexist, African elephants consume the desert date.

Medicinal
Desert date fruit is mixed into porridge and eaten by nursing mothers, and the oil is consumed for headache and to improve lactation.

Bark extracts and the fruit repel or destroy freshwater  snails and copepods, organisms that act as intermediary hosts of parasites including Schistosoma, Bilharzia, and guinea worm. Worm infections are likewise treated with desert date, as are liver and spleen disorders. A decoction of the bark is also used as an abortifacient and an antidote for arrow poison in West African traditional medicine.

The seed contains 30-48% fixed (non-volatile) oil, like the leaves, fruit pulp, bark and roots, and contains the sapogenins diosgenin and yamogenin. Saponins likewise occur in the roots, bark wood and fruit.

Agroforestry
The tree is managed through agroforestry. It is planted along irrigation canals and is used to attract insects for trapping. The pale to brownish yellow wood is used to make furniture and durable items such as tools, and is a low-smoke firewood that makes good charcoal. The smaller trees and branches are used as living or cut fences because they are resilient and thorny. The tree fixes nitrogen. It is grown for its fruit in plantations in several areas. The bark yields fibers, the natural gums from the branches are used as glue, and the seeds have been used to make jewelry and beads.

Tattoos
Various Sahel tribes use the thorn of the tree to make incisions that result in tattoos.

Etymology
The generic part of the binomial Balanites derives from the Greek word for an acorn and refers to the fruit, this name was coined by Alire Delile in 1813. in Descr. Egypte, Hist. Nat. 221 1813. The specific name aegyptiaca was applied by Carl Linnaeus as the species was initially described from specimens collected in Egypt. However, according to ICBN Art 62.4: "Generic names ending in -anthes, -oides or -odes are treated as feminine and those ending in -ites as masculine, irrespective of the gender assigned to them by the original author." Accordingly, the orthographic variant name that complies with ICBN Art 62.4 for this species is Balanites aegyptiacus.

References

External links

 Balanites aegyptiacus in BoDD – Botanical Dermatology Database

aegyptiaca
Trees of Africa
Trees of Asia
Trees of the Arabian Peninsula
Edible plants
Energy crops
Fruits originating in Africa
Plants used in traditional African medicine
Plants described in 1753
Taxa named by Carl Linnaeus